"Ibid" is a parody by American horror fiction writer H. P. Lovecraft, written in 1927 or 1928, and first published in the January 1938, issue of O-Wash-Ta-Nong.

Summary
"Ibid" is a mock biography of the Roman scholar Ibidus (486–587), whose masterpiece was Op. Cit., "wherein all the significant undercurrents of Graeco-Roman thought were crystallized once and for all." The piece traces the skull of Ibidus, once the possession of Charlemagne, William the Conqueror and other notables, to the United States, where it travels via Salem, Massachusetts and Providence, Rhode Island to a prairie dog hole in Milwaukee, Wisconsin.

Satire
The story is prefaced with the epigraph "'...As Ibid says in his famous Lives of the Poets.'--From a student theme". But S. T. Joshi and David E. Schultz report that the "target of the satire in 'Ibid' is not so much the follies of students as the pomposity of academic scholarship."

Notes

References
H. P. Lovecraft, Miscellaneous Writings.
S. T. Joshi and David E. Schultz, An H. P. Lovecraft Encyclopedia.

External links
 
 

Short stories by H. P. Lovecraft
Fiction set in ancient Rome
Works originally published in American magazines
1938 short stories